= Pea Hill Shores, Virginia =

Unincorporated community in Virginia, United States

Coordinates: 36°34′51″N 77°51′56″W

Pea Hill Shores is an unincorporated community located in Brunswick County, in the U.S. state of Virginia.
